Luis José Rueda Aparicio (born 3 March 1962) is a Colombian prelate who is Metropolitan Archbishop of Bogotá. He was Metropolitan Archbishop of Popayán from 2018 to 2020 and Bishop of Montelíbano from 2012 to 2018.

Biography 
Luis José Rueda Aparicio was born in San Gil, Santander, on 3 March 1962, the tenth of eleven siblings. Before deciding to become a priest he worked in construction alongside his father and managed a laboratory in a cement factory. He studied philosophy in the major seminary of Socorro y San Gil and theology in the major seminary of Bucaramanga. He was ordained a priest of the Diocese of Socorro y San Gil on 23 November 1989. He earned a licentiate in moral theology at Rome's Alphonsian Academy. His pastoral assignments included parishes in Albania, Curití, Pinchote, Mogotes, and Barichara. He held several other positions in the administration of the diocese, taught at the seminary from 1994 to 1999, and became pastoral vicar of the diocese.

On 2 February 2012, Pope Benedict XVI named him Bishop of Montelíbano. He received his episcopal consecration on 14 April in the Cathedral de La Santa Cruz in San Gil from Aldo Cavalli, Apostolic Nuncio to Colombia, and was installed on 28 April. In July 2017 he was elected President of the Episcopal Commission for Social and Charitable Pastoral Care.

On 19 May 2018, Pope Francis appointed him Archbishop of Popayán. He was installed there on 7 July. He received his pallium, the symbol of his office as a metropolitan archbishop, from Pope Francis in St. Peter's Basilica on 29 June 2018. He dedicated the year 2020 as the archdiocese's "Year of Fraternity" to promote social solidarity and ecological conversion.

On 25 April 2020, Pope Francis appointed him Archbishop of Bogotá.  He was installed there on 11 June.

He has been an outspoken supporter of the peace agreement of 2016 between the government of Colombia and the FARC rebels and protested against the assassination of social leaders.

References

External links
 (Luis José Rueda Aparicio)

External links

 

20th-century Colombian Roman Catholic priests
Alphonsian Academy alumni
1962 births
Living people
People from Santander Department
Roman Catholic archbishops of Bogotá
Roman Catholic bishops of Montelibano
Roman Catholic archbishops of Popayán
21st-century Roman Catholic archbishops in Colombia